McCotter is a surname. Notable people with the surname include:

Brian McCotter (born 1984), Irish basketball player
Jim McCotter (born 1945), American businessman
Lane McCotter, American federal police officer
Thaddeus McCotter (born 1965), American politician

Surnames of Irish origin
Anglicised Irish-language surnames